Na Liu (born 7 February 1983) is a British table tennis player.

Early life 
Liu was born in Liao Ning, China. Liu was raised in China and has lived in Belfast, Northern Ireland since 2001, gaining British citizenship in 2008.

Career 
In table tennis, she competed for Great Britain at the 2012 Summer Olympics and represented Northern Ireland in 2010 at the Commonwealth Games in Delhi, India. She started playing tennis at the age of 7.

References

External links 
 Na Liu profile

British female table tennis players
Chinese emigrants to the United Kingdom
Table tennis players at the 2012 Summer Olympics
Olympic table tennis players of Great Britain
1983 births
Living people
Table tennis players from Shenyang
Naturalised table tennis players
Table tennis players at the 2010 Commonwealth Games
Commonwealth Games competitors for Northern Ireland